Ghislain N'Clomande Konan (born 27 December 1995) is an Ivorian professional footballer who plays as a left-back for Saudi Professional League club Al Nassr and the Ivory Coast national team.

Club career
He made his professional debut in the Segunda Liga for Vitória de Guimarães B on 17 February 2016 in a game against Atlético CP.

He made his Primeira Liga debut for Vitória de Guimarães on 10 December 2016, when he played the whole game in a 2–1 victory over Boavista.

Konan signed for Stade de Reims for a £3.6 million transfer fee from Vitória de Guimarāes in summer 2017. He made his debut in a 1–0 win away against OGC Nice.

International career
Konan made his debut for Ivory Coast in a 2018 World Cup qualification 0–0 tie with Mali on 6 October 2017.

References

External links

 
 

1995 births
Living people
Footballers from Abidjan
Association football fullbacks
Ivorian footballers
Ivory Coast international footballers
Primeira Liga players
Liga Portugal 2 players
Ligue 1 players
Saudi Professional League players
ASEC Mimosas players
Vitória S.C. B players
Vitória S.C. players
Stade de Reims players
Al Nassr FC players
Ivorian expatriate footballers
Expatriate footballers in Portugal
Expatriate footballers in France
Expatriate footballers in Saudi Arabia
Ivorian expatriate sportspeople in Portugal
Ivorian expatriate sportspeople in France
Ivorian expatriate sportspeople in Saudi Arabia
2021 Africa Cup of Nations players